Vincent "Vinnie" Taylor (July 31, 1948 - April 19, 1974) was an American lead guitar player best known from the group, Sha Na Na. His birth name was Christopher Hempstead Donald. He graduated from Kent School in 1965 and Columbia College in 1971.

In February 1971 he replaced guitarist Larry "Israel" Packer. He played with the band until he died from an accidental heroin overdose after a concert at University Hall at the University of Virginia on April 17, 1974.

Escaped convict Elmer Edward Solly assumed the name Vinnie Taylor while a fugitive and performed under this stage name.

References

1949 births
1974 deaths
20th-century American guitarists
American rock guitarists
American male guitarists
Columbia College (New York) alumni
Deaths by heroin overdose in Virginia
Kent School alumni
Sha Na Na members
20th-century American male musicians